Newmarracarroceras is an ammonite from the early middle Jurassic with a ribbed subinvolute shell with a keel running along the venter, or outer rim. The umbilicus is moderately wide, exposing the inner whorls exposed in part.

Newmarracarroceras has a fairly wide geographic range and includes species previously described under Fontannesia. Related genera include Asthenoceras, Fontannesia, Guhsania, and Witchellia''.

References

 

Ammonitida genera
Sonniniidae
Ammonites of Australia
Jurassic ammonites
Ammonites of Europe